Dick Norman and Horia Tecău were the defending champions but Tecău chose not to compete and Norman teamed up with James Cerretani. They lost in the first round to Benjamin Becker and Alexander Waske.
Marcos Baghdatis and Mikhail Youzhny won the final against Ivan Dodig and Mate Pavić 6–2, 6–2.

Seeds

Draw

Draw

References
 Main Draw

PBZ Zagreb Indoors - Doubles
2012 Doubles
2012 PBZ Zagreb Indoors